The 24th Asian Baseball Championship was contested in Taichung, Taiwan in November and December 2007. The tournament is sanctioned by the Asian Baseball Federation. The winner of the tournament will gain automatic entry into the 2008 Olympic Games in Beijing. The second and third place teams will advance to the final 2008 Olympic qualifier, also scheduled to be played in Taiwan in the spring of 2008.

B Level
The B level teams are Hong Kong (IBAF Asian Cup Champion 2006), Thailand, Philippines and Pakistan. However, the winner will advance to join the three A level teams in a round robin competition.

November 27, 2007

November 28, 2007

November 29, 2007

A Level
The winner from the B Level of the tournament will join the three traditional powers of Asia in a round robin competition. All games will be played at Taichung Intercontinental Baseball Stadium.

December 1, 2007

December 2, 2007

December 3, 2007

Final standings

Controversy
In the match between Japan and South Korea on December 2, a dispute arose over the lineup table of the South Korea team.  In the tournament, teams were obliged to submit a starting players table 1 hour before a game begin.  Managers have made a consensus to change players if unexpected injuries were happen, which are commonly accepted in the international baseball games. 

Despite these arrangements, the South Korea manager Kim Kyung-Moon drastically changed his starting players immediately before the game, including a starting pitcher and this substitution clearly advantaged the South Korea team. Japanese manager Senichi Hoshino requested an explanation but his appeal to an umpire was turned down.

After the game was over, which resulted a Japanese win, Hoshino made comments critical of South Korean acts as ungentlemanly conduct.  Japanese team officially submitted a protest note to the South Korea team and the International Baseball Federation (IBAF). John C. Ostermeyer, secretary general of IBAF, acknowledged this appeal and announced that IBAF express regret at the South Korea team and plan to change regulations at a meeting held in January 2008.

See also
 List of sporting events in Taiwan

References

External links
 Schedule - http://www.ctba.org.tw/news_detail.php?id=52 (Traditional Chinese)

See also
 2006 Intercontinental Cup
 Baseball at the 2006 Asian Games
 2007 Baseball World Cup
 Baseball at the 2008 Summer Olympics - Qualification
 List of sporting events in Taiwan

Asian Baseball Championship
Asian Baseball Championship
2007
Sport in Taichung
Baseball qualification for the 2008 Summer Olympics
Asian Baseball Championship
Asian Baseball Championship